Benjamin Franklin Flanders (January 26, 1816 – March 13, 1896) was a teacher, politician and planter in New Orleans, Louisiana. In 1867, he was appointed by the military commander as the 21st Governor of Louisiana during Reconstruction, a position which he held for some six months. He was the second and, as of 2023, the last Republican mayor of New Orleans, Louisiana.

Early life
Flanders was born in Bristol, New Hampshire. At the age of twenty-six, he graduated from Dartmouth College in Dartmouth, New Hampshire.

In January 1843 he moved to New Orleans and read law under Charles M. Emerson. The following year he left this study to become a schoolteacher and principal. In 1845, Flanders became editor of New Orleans Tropic, a local newspaper. In 1847 he married Susan H. Sawyer in Bristol, New Hampshire. She returned with him to New Orleans, where they had six children together.

Political career
Flanders became active in politics, elected as a Democratic alderman representing the 3rd Municipal District of New Orleans, serving from 1847 to 1852. In 1852, he was selected as the secretary and treasurer of the New Orleans, Opelousas and Great Western Railroad, a position he held until 1862. In 1861, he fled New Orleans, leaving his family behind. He had opposed secession, and sentiment against Unionists was very strong.

Flanders made his way to Cairo, Illinois; Columbus, Ohio; and eventually, New York City. He did not return to New Orleans until April 1862, when the city was captured by Union troops.  On July 20, he was appointed by the military government as New Orleans City Treasurer. He served until his election to Congress on December 12, 1862. He was elected along with Michael Hahn as at-large Representatives of Louisiana, assuming the seat left vacant after J. E. Bouligny's term expired in 1861. Flanders and Hahn were not seated in Congress until the last fifteen days of their terms in February 1863.
  
On July 13, 1863, Flanders was made the Captain of Company C, 5th Regiment Louisiana Volunteers, a Union Army unit.  He was honorably discharged in August 1863, when he was appointed a Special Agent of the United States Treasury Department of the Southern Region by Secretary of the Treasury Salmon P. Chase. He held this position until 1866. While in office, he generated commissions for the government by selling confiscated cotton from Confederate plantations. The Department of Treasury controlled licensing of cotton brokers, trying to regulate the market, but a black market flourished for the lucrative sale of cotton.

In 1864, Flanders campaigned for governor and finished in third place behind Michael Hahn and Fellows. He was appointed by Republicans as the first Supervising Special Agent of the Freedmen’s Bureau, Department of the Gulf. At the same time, he led the movement to create a local Republican Party in Louisiana. He formed the 'Friends of Universal Suffrage' with other Louisiana Unionists (known as scalawags to opponents), as well as free men of color (who had been free before the war) and freedmen; they were working to gain black suffrage and to repeal the Louisiana Black Codes. These laws had been passed to control the movement of freedmen. Fearful of the black majority in many Louisiana districts, most white Democrats opposed giving freedmen suffrage, especially after Confederate veterans were temporarily disenfranchised unless they took a loyalty oath. The tension over the rights of freed slaves escalated into New Orleans riot of 1866, in which whites attacked blacks.

In 1867, General Philip Sheridan, Commander of the 5th Military District, which included Louisiana and Texas, removed elected Governor James Madison Wells for not responding to the riots appropriately and for not advancing the rights of freedmen. Sheridan appointed Flanders as Governor of Louisiana. About six months later, on January 1, 1868, Major General Winfield Scott Hancock, as the new military commander of Louisiana, removed all radical Republicans from state offices. Governor Flanders resigned on January 8 and was replaced by General Hancock's appointee, Joshua Baker.

In 1867, he appointed Monroe Baker as mayor of St. Martinville, Louisiana who may have been the first African-American to serve as mayor in the United States.

In 1870, Governor Henry C. Warmoth, elected as part of the Reconstruction-era civil government, appointed Flanders as Mayor of New Orleans. As of 2023, Flanders remains the most recent Republican mayor of the city. He was later elected to a full two-year mayoral term, serving until 1873.  That year, President Ulysses S. Grant appointed Flanders as Assistant Treasurer of the United States. Flanders ran unsuccessfully in 1888 as a Republican candidate for Louisiana State Treasurer; by that time Democrats were controlling most statewide elected positions.

Flanders retired to his Ben Alva plantation in Lafayette Parish. He died there in 1896. His remains were interred at Metairie Cemetery in New Orleans.

References

 Biography at the Biographical Directory of the United States Congress
National Governor's Association biography
State of Louisiana - Biography

Governors of Louisiana
1816 births
1896 deaths
People from Bristol, New Hampshire
Louisiana Republicans
19th-century American Episcopalians
Dartmouth College alumni
Union Army officers
People of Louisiana in the American Civil War
Members of the United States House of Representatives from Louisiana
Mayors of New Orleans
Louisiana Unionists
Unionist Party members of the United States House of Representatives
Republican Party governors of Louisiana
19th-century American politicians
American lawyers admitted to the practice of law by reading law
Louisiana Democrats